

The Farman BN.4, a.k.a. Super Goliath, was a very large 1920s French biplane designed by Farman as a long-range night bomber.

Development
Often known by the military designation BN.4 (Bombardement de Nuit Strategique, 4 places), some sources refer to it as the Super Goliath though that name was also applied to the Farman F.141.  It was a four-seat long range night bomber. The company exhibited the BN.4 at the 1921 Paris Salon de l'Aeronautique. The BN.4 was a four-engined three-bay biplane powered by  four Lorraine piston engines mounted in tandem pairs on the lower wing. It had a biplane tail unit and a tailskid landing gear with twin-wheel main units. It had provision for a gunner in the nose section and amidships with additional machine guns that fired downwards and to the rear.

By the time the aircraft was test flown a pair of twin nose wheels had been added to stop the aircraft nosing over on soft grass airfields. After the aircraft had performed a number of test flights the military had lost interest in spending on new equipment in the post-war era. A civil version was looked at but it would have been too large and the BN.4 was not ordered into production.

Specifications

References

Notes

Bibliography

1920s French bomber aircraft
BN.4